The 2017–18 VfL Wolfsburg season was the 73rd season in the football club's history and 21st consecutive and overall season in the top flight of German football, the Bundesliga, having been promoted from the 2. Bundesliga in 1997. In addition to the domestic league, VfL Wolfsburg also participated in the season's edition of the domestic cup, the DFB-Pokal. This was the 16th season for Wolfsburg in the Volkswagen Arena, located in Wolfsburg, Lower Saxony, Germany. The season covers a period from 1 July 2017 to 30 June 2018.

Players

Squad information

Competitions

Overview

Bundesliga

League table

Results summary

Results by round

Matches

Relegation play-offs

DFB-Pokal

Statistics

Appearances and goals

|-
! colspan=14 style=background:#dcdcdc; text-align:center| Goalkeepers

|-
! colspan=14 style=background:#dcdcdc; text-align:center| Defenders

|-
! colspan=14 style=background:#dcdcdc; text-align:center| Midfielders

|-
! colspan=14 style=background:#dcdcdc; text-align:center| Forwards

|-
! colspan=14 style=background:#dcdcdc; text-align:center| Players transferred out during the season

References

VfL Wolfsburg seasons
Wolfsburg, VfL